Acleris takeuchii is a species of moth of the family Tortricidae. It is found in Japan (Honshu) and Korea.

The length of the forewings is about 7 mm. The ground colour of the forewings is white, in the posterior area darkened with yellowish. The edges of the wing and the posterior area is strigulated with dark
brown. The hindwings are pale brownish, paler and more creamy at the base.

References

Moths described in 1964
takeuchii
Moths of Asia